Carolinum may refer to:
 Carolinum, Zürich, the former Prophezei or Prophezey of the Grossmünster priory in Zürich in Switzerland
 Carolinum University, the Charles University in Prague respectively the former Universitas Carolina Pragensis in the Czech Republic
 Carolinum, the main historical building of Charles University in Prague
 Carolinum (Nysa), the main historical building of Charles Gimnazium in Nysa

See also: Carolinium